Michelle Redfern is a former association football player who represented New Zealand at international level.

Redfern made a single appearance for Football Ferns in a 2–0 win over Australia on 26 October 1991.

References

Year of birth missing (living people)
Living people
New Zealand women's international footballers
New Zealand women's association footballers
Women's association football defenders